The 2019–20 Oman Professional League is the 44th edition of the Oman Professional League, the top football league in Oman. The season started on 14 September 2019 and was due to end in April 2020 but the season was suspended at match day 23 (out of 26) due to the COVID-19 pandemic.

Team

League table

References

Top level Omani football league seasons
2019–20 in Omani football
Oman
Oman Professional League, 2019-20